Hassan Shahsavan (born 30 December 1975 in Tehran, Iran) is an amateur Iranian-born Australian Greco-Roman wrestler, who played for the men's middleweight category. He won a bronze medal for his division at the 2010 Commonwealth Games in New Delhi, India.

Shahsavan initially selected as a member of the Iranian wrestling team for the 2000 Summer Olympics in Sydney, but did not compete. He moved to Australia a year later, and eventually received a citizenship one week too late to qualify for the Australian team at the 2004 Summer Olympics in Athens.

Shahsavan represented his adopted nation Australia at the 2008 Summer Olympics in Beijing, where he competed for the men's 74 kg class. He received a bye for the preliminary round of sixteen, before losing out to Kazakhstan's Roman Melyoshin, with a three-set technical score (0–3, 2–1, 0–5), and a classification point score of 1–3.

References

External links
Profile – Australian Olympic Team
Profile – International Wrestling Database
NBC 2008 Olympics profile

1975 births
Living people
Olympic wrestlers of Australia
Wrestlers at the 2008 Summer Olympics
Wrestlers at the 2010 Commonwealth Games
Commonwealth Games bronze medallists for Australia
People from Tehran
Iranian emigrants to Australia
Australian male sport wrestlers
Commonwealth Games medallists in wrestling
Medallists at the 2010 Commonwealth Games